Mesosa marmorata is a species of beetle in the family Cerambycidae. It was described by Stephan von Breuning and Itzinger in 1943. It is known from Myanmar and Laos.

References

marmorata
Beetles described in 1943